Charmian II was an express cruiser owned by C. Huges Manly of Baltimore built in Annapolis, Maryland by Chance Marine Construction Company and in September 1915 thought by boating observers after trials to be perhaps the fastest cruiser in her class in the United States. The  cruiser was the largest V-bottom cruiser at the time. Manly was a member of both the Baltimore Yacht Club and Maryland Motor Boat Club with Charmian II a part of both fleets.

Charmian II was built in 1915 with the overall design by Lewis R. Baker of Baltimore. The cruiser is noted as one of the vessels assigned official numbers and signals by the Department of Commerce, Bureau of Navigation for the week ended June 5, 1915.

The cruiser was powered by two 8 cylinder, 150  horsepower Sterling gasoline engines located, along with an electric generating set located aft and between the engines in a spacious engine room absent much of the clutter such as bells due to the design of the controls.

The  beam cruiser accommodated five people for extended cruises  with a double stateroom and toilet forward of the bridge and a storage are and aft of the chain locker in the bow. Going aft was a single stateroom, toilet, galley, and a  salon with two transom berths. Aft was a self bailing cockpit. The interior was furnished in mahogany and white enamel.

The cruiser participated in races, some of considerable length. Manly and the cruiser are shown as running and winning the  Baltimore to Camden race in 1915. By 1917 the cruiser was owned by J. E. Stanton Jr. of New Bedford, Massachusetts with the cruiser registered in New York.

The United States Navy acquired the vessel from Stanton under free lease on 29 May 1917 for use during World War I as the Section Patrol vessel USS Charmian II (SP-696). The cruiser was assigned to the 2nd Naval District in southern New England, Charmian II served on patrol duty for the rest of World War I. The Navy returned Charmian II to Stanton on 25 November 1918.

The 1930  U.S. register shows the cruiser as owned by Richard Malcomson of New York with the 1931 register listing Charmian II as "abandoned."

Footnotes

References

External links
 Photos, interior/exterior
 Photo & caption

1915 ships
Ships built in Annapolis, Maryland
Motor yachts
Motorboat racing